Vasily Rodchev (1768–1803) was a Russian painter.  The son of a carpenter, he was active primarily as a history painter, although at least one portrait by him is known.  He studied at the Academy in Saint Petersburg, taking lessons from one P. Sokolov; in 1800 he received the title of Academician.  In 1803, not long before his death, he was made a professor at the Academy.

References
 Russian Portrait [sic] of the 18th and 19th century (exhibition catalog).  Moscow, 1976.

18th-century painters from the Russian Empire
Russian male painters
1768 births
1803 deaths
History painters
19th-century painters from the Russian Empire
19th-century male artists from the Russian Empire